In mathematics and more precisely in functional analysis, the Aluthge transformation is an operation defined on the set of bounded operators of a Hilbert space. It was introduced by Ariyadasa Aluthge to study p-hyponormal linear operators.

Definition 
 

More generally, for any real number , the -Aluthge transformation is defined as

Example 
For vectors , let   denote the operator defined as 
 

An elementary calculation shows that if , then

Notes

References

External links 

 

Bilinear forms
Matrices
Topology